John Anthony Cooper (born February 16, 1969) is an American college basketball coach who is an assistant coach at Oklahoma State. He was the head men's basketball coach at Miami University, accepting the position on April 6, 2012 after Charlie Coles announced his retirement. He was let go by the university at the end of the 2016–17 season. Prior to accepting the Job at Miami, Cooper was the head coach at Tennessee State University from 2009–2012.

Head coaching record

References

1969 births
Living people
Basketball coaches from Missouri
American expatriate basketball people in the Netherlands
Auburn Tigers men's basketball coaches
Basketball players from Kansas City, Missouri
College men's basketball head coaches in the United States
Fayetteville State Broncos basketball coaches
Fort Wayne Fury players
Miami RedHawks men's basketball coaches
Oregon Ducks men's basketball coaches
South Carolina Gamecocks men's basketball coaches
Tennessee State Tigers basketball coaches
Wichita State Shockers men's basketball players
American men's basketball players
Forwards (basketball)